Mary Schryer was a Liberal Member of the Legislative Assembly (MLA) in New Brunswick, Canada, representing the constituency of Quispamsis. Schryer was elected in the September 18, 2006 general election for the Legislative Assembly of New Brunswick. She lost her riding in the September 27, 2010 election.

Prior to the election, Schryer was a financial planner and sales manager with Clarica, part of Sun Life Financial, in Quispamsis, New Brunswick, a director of the area's health services corporation and a member of the town council.

She was named to the cabinet on October 3, 2006.

External links
New Brunswick Liberal Party: Mary Schryer

Members of the Executive Council of New Brunswick
New Brunswick Liberal Association MLAs
Living people
Businesspeople from New Brunswick
Year of birth missing (living people)
Women MLAs in New Brunswick
New Brunswick municipal councillors
Women municipal councillors in Canada
21st-century Canadian politicians
21st-century Canadian women politicians
Women government ministers of Canada
Health ministers of New Brunswick